1830 Naval Air Squadron (1830 NAS) was a Naval Air Squadron of the Royal Navy's Fleet Air Arm.

From  1830 NAS participated in Operation Robson over Sumatra in December 1944.

Naval Reserve
1831 Squadron reformed at RNAS Abbotsinch (HMS Sanderling (now Glasgow Airport ) in Renfrewshire on 15 August 1947 as part of the Royal Navy Volunteer Reserve, equipped with Fairey Firefly fighters.

References

Citations

Bibliography

External links
 

1800 series Fleet Air Arm squadrons
Military units and formations established in 1943
Military units and formations of the Royal Navy in World War II